Camerata Picena is a comune (municipality) in the Province of Ancona in the Italian region Marche, located about  southwest of Ancona.

Camerata Picena borders the following municipalities: Agugliano, Ancona, Chiaravalle, Falconara Marittima, Jesi.

References

Cities and towns in the Marche